Walter Bigari better known by his stage name Walter Brandi was an Italian actor. In his book on European exploitation films, Danny Shipka described Brandi as "one of the first de facto stars of Italian horror/exploitation", while noting he was never as popular as Christopher Lee, Barbara Steele or Peter Cushing. He predominantly acted in genre films in the 1960s. Brandi died in May 1997.

Filmography

References

Sources

External links
 

Italian male film actors
20th-century Italian male actors
1997 deaths